Umri Pragane Balapur is a census town in Akola district in the Indian state of Maharashtra.

Demographics
 India census, Umri Pragane Balapur had a population of 16,262. Males constitute 52% of the population and females 48%. Umri Pragane Balapur has an average literacy rate of 79%, higher than the national average of 59.5%: male literacy is 83%, and female literacy is 74%. In Umri Pragane Balapur, 12% of the population is under 6 years of age.

References

Cities and towns in Akola district